The Aasen mortar (Mortier Aasen) was a 3.5-inch (88.9-mm) gun-mortar (or bomb thrower under the classification of the time). The Aasen was invented in France in 1915 by Nils Aasen, a Norwegian arms designer. It was adopted by the Russian Empire in 1915-1916, and was used during the First World War.

The barrel of the mortar was steel. Aasen mortar was a breech loading weapon so a shell was loaded separately and the bolt action discharging a blank rifle round connected to a barrel. This device was a modified form of the obsolete Gras rifle, which was transferred to Russia by France in substantial numbers. The hoisting mechanism was made of two slats, attached to the rear of the barrel, and rod folding rack. The weight of the mortar in firing mode was approximately 1.5 pood (54.2 lbs).

References

External links
 https://web.archive.org/web/20110727083617/http://ww1.milua.org/images/aazin2.jpg
 https://web.archive.org/web/20110727083639/http://ww1.milua.org/images/aazin-mine01.jpg
 https://web.archive.org/web/20111001150017/http://storage.canalblog.com/56/59/49081/28945703.jpg

Infantry mortars
World War I mortars of Russia
88 mm artillery
Norwegian inventions
Gun-mortars